Death and Diamonds may refer to:

 Death and Diamonds (film), a 1968 German film
 a book in the Undercover Brothers series